Capanne is a small village (curazia) of San Marino. It belongs to the municipality of Fiorentino.

See also
Fiorentino
Crociale
Pianacci

Curazie in San Marino
Fiorentino